Henry St John Reade (4 January 1840 – 13 February 1884) was an English first-class cricketer, clergyman and educator.

The son of William Barrington Reade, he was born in January 1840 at Streatley, Berkshire. He was educated at Tonbridge School, before going up to University College, Oxford. In his first year at Oxford, he made his debut in first-class cricket when he played twice for the Gentlemen of Kent against the Gentlemen of England at Lord's and Canterbury in 1858. He later made three first-class appearances for Oxford University in 1861–62, in addition to playing for the Gentlemen of the South against the Gentlemen of the North in 1862. In six first-class matches, Reade scored 166 with a high score of 49. With the ball, he took 13 wickets with best figures of 4 for 22.

After graduating from Oxford, Reade took holy orders in the Church of England. He was an assistant master at Haileybury, before becoming the headmaster of Beccles Grammar School and later the Godolphin School in Hammersmith. From 1876, he was the headmaster of Oundle School, a position he held until his death at Shepherd's Bush in February 1884.

References

External links

1840 births
1884 deaths
People from West Berkshire District
People educated at Tonbridge School
Alumni of University College, Oxford
English cricketers
Gentlemen of Kent cricketers
Oxford University cricketers
Gentlemen of the South cricketers
19th-century English Anglican priests
Heads of schools in London
Headmasters of Oundle School
Teachers of Oundle School